Publius Septimius Geta (7 March 189 – 26 December 211) was Roman emperor with his father Septimius Severus and older brother Caracalla from 209, when he was named Augustus like his brother, who had held the title from 198. Severus died in 211, and although he intended for his sons to rule together, they proved incapable of sharing power, culminating with the murder of Geta in December of that year.

Early life

Geta was the younger son of Septimius Severus by his second wife Julia Domna. He was born on 7 March in either Rome or Mediolanum, at a time when his father was only a provincial governor at the service of Emperor Commodus. In 198, Geta was raised to Caesar. Septimius Severus gave him the title of augustus in late 209.

During the campaign against the Britons in the early 3rd century AD, imperial propaganda promoted the image of a happy family that shared the responsibilities of rule. Geta's brother Caracalla acted as Severus' second-in-command, and administrative and bureaucratic duties were Geta's responsibility.  In reality, however, the rivalry and antipathy between the brothers did not abate. With the death of Severus in 211, control of the empire passed to Geta and Caracalla jointly.

Joint Emperor
When Septimius Severus died in Eboracum on 4 February 211, Caracalla and Geta were proclaimed joint emperors and returned to Rome. Their mother, Julia Domna, who had served as a crucial advisor and confidante to her husband, was able to maintain her political influence over two co-emperors. It is said that on the journey from Britain to Rome the two brothers kept well away from each other, not once lodging in the same house or sharing a common meal.

Their joint rule was a failure. The Imperial Palace was divided into two separate sections, and neither allowed the servants of the other into his own. They only met in the presence of their mother, and with a strong military guard, being in constant fear of assassination. The current stability of their joint government was only through the mediation and leadership of their mother, Julia Domna, accompanied by other senior courtiers and generals in the military. The historian Herodian asserted that the brothers decided to split the empire in two halves, but with the strong opposition of their mother, the idea was rejected, when, by the end of 211, the situation had become unbearable. Caracalla tried unsuccessfully to murder Geta during the festival of Saturnalia (17 December). Finally, the next week, Caracalla had his mother arrange a peace meeting with his brother in his mother's apartments, thus depriving Geta of his bodyguards, and then had him murdered in her arms by centurions.

Caracalla ordered the damnatio memoriae, which was thoroughly carried out, as is clear from the archaeological record. Reportedly, Caracalla was thereafter tormented by guilt over his deed, but sought to expiate it by adding to this crime the proscription of all his brother's former followers. Cassius Dio stated that around 20,000 men and women were killed or proscribed on this charge during this time.

Portrait
Very few marble portraits attributable to Geta survive to date, presumably due to the very thorough damnatio memoriae which resulted in the erasing of his images.  However Roman coins with his image are plentiful, and can reflect how his father Septimius Severus and mother Julia Domna and later Geta himself wanted him to be seen by the Roman people (and especially the Roman military).

Images of Geta and his older brother Caracalla cannot be well distinguished until the death of the father.  Both sons were supposed to be presented as equally suitable heirs to the throne, showing thus more "depth" to the dynasty.

On his coins, Caracalla, who became Augustus in 198, was shown with a wreath of laurels, while Geta remained bareheaded until he himself became Augustus in 209. Between 209 and their father's death in February 211, both brothers were shown as equally mature young men with a short full beard, ready to take over the empire.  Between the death of Septimus Severus and the assassination of Geta, Caracalla's portraits did not change, while Geta was depicted with a long beard with hanging hairs, much like his father, a strong indication of Geta's efforts to be seen as the "true" successor of his father.

The Severan Tondo panel painting depicts Septimius Severus and his family with an obliterated face assumed to be Geta.

Gallery

Severan dynasty family tree

See also
 Septimia gens
 Severan dynasty family tree

References

Bibliography 
 Dio Cassius lxxvii; Herodian iv. I.

External links

Life of Geta (Historia Augusta at LacusCurtius: Latin text and English translation)

189 births
211 deaths
2nd-century Punic people
3rd-century Punic people
3rd-century Roman emperors
3rd-century murdered monarchs
British traditional history
Burials at the Castel Sant'Angelo
Deified Roman emperors
Emesene dynasty
Imperial Roman consuls
Murdered Roman emperors
People from Homs
Roman emperors to suffer posthumous denigration or damnatio memoriae
Septimii
Severan dynasty
Sons of Roman emperors
Roman pharaohs
Family of Septimius Severus